Ageratum conyzoides (billygoat-weed, chick weed, goatweed, whiteweed, mentrasto) is native to Tropical America, especially Brazil, and is an invasive weed in many other regions. It is an herb that is 0.5–1 m. high, with ovate leaves 2–6 cm long, and flowers are white to mauve.

In Vietnamese, the plant is called cứt lợn (meaning "pig feces") due to its growth in dirty areas.

Uses
As a medicinal plant, Ageratum conyzoides is widely used by many traditional cultures, against dysentery and diarrhea.  It is also an insecticide and nematicide.

Toxicity
Ingesting A. conyzoides can cause liver lesions and tumors. There was a mass poisoning incident in Ethiopia as a result of contamination of grain with A. conyzoides. The plant contains the pyrrolizidine alkaloids lycopsamine and echinatine.

Weed risk
A. conyzoides is prone to becoming a rampant environmental weed when grown outside of its natural range. It is an invasive weed in Africa, Australia, Southeast Asia, Hawaii, and the USA. It is considered a moderate weed of rice cultivation in Asia.

Gallery

References

External links

Plants For Future: Ageratum conyzoides
Tropical Plant Database: Ageratum conyzoides
Global Invasive Species Database: Ageratum conyzoides
 Ageratum conyzoides photos
Ageratum conyzoides L. Medicinal Plant Images Database (School of Chinese Medicine, Hong Kong Baptist University)  

conyzoides
Flora of South America
Medicinal plants of South America
Plant toxin insecticides
Plants described in 1753
Taxa named by Carl Linnaeus